These are the Billboard magazine R&B singles chart number one hits of 1995:

Chart history

See also
1995 in music
List of number-one R&B hits (United States)
List of number-one R&B albums of 1995 (U.S.)

References

1995
United States R and B singles
1995 in American music